Grant County is a county in the U.S. state of South Dakota. As of the 2020 United States Census, the population was 7,556. The county seat is Milbank. The county was founded in 1873 and organized in 1878. It is named for Ulysses S. Grant, 18th President of the United States.

Geography

Grant County lies on the east side of South Dakota. Its east boundary line abuts the west boundary line of the state of Minnesota. The terrain consists of rolling hills, sloping to the northeast. The area is largely devoted to agriculture. The highest point of the terrain is on the county's south boundary line, towards its southwest corner, at 2,014' (614m) ASL.

The lowest point in the state of South Dakota is located on Big Stone Lake at Big Stone City in Grant County, adjacent to Ortonville, Minnesota, where the lake flows into the Minnesota River.

Major highways

 Interstate 29
 U.S. Route 12
 U.S. Route 81
 South Dakota Highway 15
 South Dakota Highway 20
 South Dakota Highway 109
 South Dakota Highway 123
 South Dakota Highway 158

Adjacent counties

 Roberts County—north
 Big Stone County, Minnesota—northeast
 Lac qui Parle County, Minnesota—east
 Deuel County—south
 Codington County—southwest
 Day County—west

Protected areas
 Mazeppa State Public Shooting Area
 Mud Lake State Public Shooting Area

Lakes

 Big Stone Lake (adjacent)
 Crooked Lake
 LaBolt Lake
 Lake Albert
 Lake Farley
 Lonesome Lake (partial)
 Mud Lake
 Myers Lake
 Summit Lake
 Twin Lakes

Demographics

2000 census
As of the 2000 United States Census, there were 7,847 people, 3,116 households, and 2,156 families in the county. The population density was 12 people per square mile (4/km2). There were 3,456 housing units at an average density of 5 per square mile (2/km2). The racial makeup of the county was 98.61% White, 0.01% Black or African American, 0.43% Native American, 0.23% Asian, 0.40% from other races, and 0.32% from two or more races. 0.55% of the population were Hispanic or Latino of any race. 52.0% were of German, 16.3% Norwegian and 5.4% American ancestry.

There were 3,116 households, out of which 33.40% had children under the age of 18 living with them, 60.60% were married couples living together, 5.20% had a female householder with no husband present, and 30.80% were non-families. 28.60% of all households were made up of individuals, and 15.00% had someone living alone who was 65 years of age or older. The average household size was 2.44 and the average family size was 3.02.

The county population contained 26.60% under the age of 18, 5.70% from 18 to 24, 25.10% from 25 to 44, 23.50% from 45 to 64, and 19.10% who were 65 years of age or older. The median age was 40 years. For every 100 females there were 97.70 males. For every 100 females age 18 and over, there were 96.10 males.

The median income for a household in the county was $33,088, and the median income for a family was $40,407. Males had a median income of $27,941 versus $20,192 for females. The per capita income for the county was $16,543. About 7.50% of families and 9.90% of the population were below the poverty line, including 9.80% of those under age 18 and 10.30% of those age 65 or over.

2010 census
As of the 2010 United States Census, there were 7,356 people, 3,089 households, and 2,076 families in the county. The racial makeup of the county was 97.1% white, 0.5% American Indian, 0.3% Asian, 0.1% black or African American, 1.1% from other races, and 0.8% from two or more races. Those of Hispanic or Latino origin made up 2.3% of the population. In terms of ancestry, 49.9% were German, 16.8% were Norwegian, 8.9% were Irish, 6.7% were Swedish, 5.6% were English, and 5.2% were American.

Of the 3,089 households, 28.1% had children under the age of 18 living with them, 57.2% were married couples living together, 6.1% had a female householder with no husband present, 32.8% were non-families, and 29.6% of all households were made up of individuals. The average household size was 2.35 and the average family size was 2.89. The median age was 45.1 years.

The median income for a household in the county was $42,625 and the median income for a family was $56,250. Males had a median income of $36,204 versus $25,567 for females. The per capita income for the county was $22,887. About 7.0% of families and 11.6% of the population were below the poverty line, including 13.8% of those under age 18 and 17.8% of those age 65 or over.

Communities

Cities
 Big Stone City 
 Milbank (county seat)

Towns

 Albee
 La Bolt
 Marvin
 Revillo
 Stockholm
 Strandburg
 Twin Brooks

Unincorporated communities
 Troy

Townships

Adams
Alban
Big Stone
Blooming Valley
Farmington
Georgia
Grant Center
Kilborn
Lura
Madison
Mazeppa
Melrose
Osceola
Stockholm
Troy
Twin Brooks
Vernon

Politics
Grant County voters have been reliably Republican for decades. In only three national elections since 1948 has the county selected the Democratic Party candidate.

See also
 National Register of Historic Places listings in Grant County, South Dakota

References

 
1878 establishments in Dakota Territory
Populated places established in 1878